Sabudana khichri is an Indian dish made from soaked sabudana (tapioca pearls). It is the dish of choice when an individual observes a "fast" during Shivratri, Navratri, or a similar Hindu religious occasion. 

It is typically prepared in Indian states of Maharashtra, Karnataka, Uttar Pradesh, Madhya Pradesh, Rajasthan and Gujarat. In major towns like Mumbai, Pune, Indore, Bhopal, Jaipur and Nagpur, it is available as street food and is widely eaten throughout the year.

External links
How sabudana went from wartime staple to one of India's favourite fasting foods
Did You Know Sabudana Has a Long History of Saving Millions of Lives? Here’s How
7 fasting-friendly food you can try this Navratri

Indian snack foods
Maharashtrian cuisine
Indian fast food